S. gardneri may refer to:
 Shorea gardneri, a plant species endemic to Sri Lanka
 Spathiphyllum gardneri, a plant species in the genus Spathiphyllum
 Stemonoporus gardneri, a plant species endemic to Sri Lanka
 Semecarpus gardneri, a plant species endemic to Sri Lanka

See also 
 Gardneri